Andreas Christian Ferdinand Flinch (3 February 1813 – 16 August 1872), a wood-engraver, was born at Copenhagen in 1813, and studied at the Academy there from 1832 to 1838. He had previously worked as a goldsmith, but he afterwards took to wood-engraving from self-tuition, and introduced a special method of his own into Denmark, consisting in drawing the outline upon the block and working out the details with a free hand. In 1840, he settled down as a lithographer, and published the popular Flinchs Almanak with woodcut illustrations. He died at Copenhagen in 1872.

References

Further reading
 Kulturarv.dk: Kunstindeks Danmark & Weilbachs Kunstnerleksikon
 Flinch, Andreas Christian Ferdinand (C. Nyrop), in Dansk Biografisk Leksikon, vol. 5, p. 207, C.F. Bricka, Gyldendal (1887–1905)

External links

1813 births
1872 deaths
19th-century Danish engravers
19th-century Danish publishers (people)
19th-century Danish printmakers
Danish lithographers
Artists from Copenhagen
Royal Danish Academy of Fine Arts alumni